Erik Tjäder (May 18, 1863 – April 9, 1949) was a Swedish diver who competed in the 1912 Summer Olympics. He finished seventh in his first round heat of the 3 metre springboard event and was not advanced to the final.

References

1863 births
1949 deaths
Swedish male divers
Olympic divers of Sweden
Divers at the 1912 Summer Olympics
19th-century Swedish people
20th-century Swedish people